"Parisian Thoroughfare," also known as "Parisienne Thorofare," is a jazz standard composed by pianist Bud Powell. It was first recorded by Powell in February of 1951 for Clef Records.

Notable recordings
On the 1954 album Clifford Brown & Max Roach which was inducted into the Grammy Hall of Fame in 1999
Jacky Terrasson and Tom Harrell included the song in their 1991 album Moon and Sand.
Terrason also covered the song in 2002 album Smile.
On the 1968 album The Jaki Byard Experience.

References

1950s jazz standards